The 1967 Individual Long Track European Championship was the 11th edition of the Long Track European Championship. The final was held on 3 September 1967 in Scheeßel, West Germany.

The title was won by Manfred Poschenreider of West Germany for the second successive year.

Venues
Qualifying Round 1 - Straubing, 1 May 1967
Qualifying Round 2 - Skive, 28 May 1967
Qualifying Round 3 - Mühldorf am Inn, 4 June 1967
Final - Scheeßel - 3 September 1967

Final Classification

References 

Motor
Motor
International sports competitions hosted by West Germany